Iris Falls (height ) is a waterfall on the Bechler River in Yellowstone National Park. Iris Falls is located just upstream from Colonnade Falls and is accessible via the Bechler River Trail. The falls were named in 1885 by members of the Arnold Hague Geological Survey for Iris, the mythological Greek goddess of the rainbow.

See also
 Waterfalls in Yellowstone National Park

Notes

Waterfalls of Yellowstone National Park
Waterfalls of Wyoming
Waterfalls of Teton County, Wyoming